Bruchko is an autobiographical book by Bruce Olson, telling the story of his work as a Christian missionary with the Motilone Barí Indians, an indigenous tribe in Colombia and Venezuela. 

The book begins by describing Olson's unusual Christian conversion experience in a church that did not recognize it. He later feels a distinct calling from God to move to South America and share his faith with a tribe called the Motilone near the border of Colombia and Venezuela, despite warnings about their unmatched violence and killings. After years of disease, torture, and other misfortune he finally gains acceptance with the Motilone. Largely through his friendship with Bobarishora ("Bobby"), Olson ("Bruchko") introduces the tribe to faith in Jesus Christ. He discovers that Jesus himself will lead His church, that the Gospel does not require destruction of indigenous culture, and that suffering is often a necessary part of the Christian life.

References

External links
http://www.bruceolson.com/english/english.htm

Religious autobiographies